Dan Kendra III (born March 15, 1976) is a former American football player. 

A highly-touted Parade All-American, 1995 national offensive player of the year high school player from the Eastern Pennsylvania Conference, Kendra picked Florida State over Penn State. After two years behind Thad Busby, Kendra was scheduled to take over as the Seminoles' starting quarterback in 1998, before tearing the PCL in his right knee during spring practice, thus elevating Marcus Outzen to the #2 quarterback spot for the entirety of the 1998 NCAA football season.

References

External links 
Florida State Seminoles bio

1976 births
Living people
American football quarterbacks
Bethlehem Catholic High School alumni
Florida State Seminoles football players
Sportspeople from Northampton County, Pennsylvania